César Camargo Mariano (born 19 September 1943) is a Brazilian pianist, arranger, composer and music producer.

Biography
Mariano was born in São Paulo. In June 1957 the American trombone player Melba Liston invited thirteen-year-old Mariano to participate in her concert at a jazz club in Rio de Janeiro, and he appeared in a program on Rio's Globo Radio called "The Boy Prodigy Who Plays Jazz".

Thar same year, Mariano met Johnny Alf, who went to live with Mariano's family due to their great friendship. Together at the family home in São Paulo, Mariano became familiar with arranging, composing, and the arts of cinema and theatre, thanks to Johnny Alf's encouragement.

Through his own instincts, tenacity and raw talent, Mariano formed amateur instrumental and vocal groups, when TV Record in São Paulo invited him for a special called "Passport to Stardom" (Passaporte para o Estrelato).

In the early 1960s, a teenaged Mariano became famous for his ability to swing and for his legendary left hand. His ensembles of that era, notably Sambalanço Trio and Som Três, are regarded today as high points in Brazilian jazz; so for his 1981 album Samambaia, one of his thirty-plus instrumental albums.

Mariano's collaborations with some of Brazil's most important singers like Wilson Simonal and Elis Regina, brought him global acclaim, such as the historic 1973 album Elis e Tom, recorded with Antônio Carlos Jobim, that featured Mariano as producer, pianist, and musical director.

Since then, Mariano had worked with an international array of musical giants, from Yo-Yo Ma, to Blossom Dearie. He also composed a wealth of soundtrack music for film and TV.

In April 1994, Mariano moved to the United States, where he lives with his wife until now. Mariano received the 2006 Latin Recording Academy Lifetime Achievement Grammy Award.

From his first marriage with singer Marisa Vertullo Brandão, a.k.a. Gata Mansa, he had a son Marcelo Mariano, today an accomplished bass player. He was married to Brazilian superstar Elis Regina for 8 years and they had two children (Pedro Mariano and Maria Rita); today they are both established singers.

From his third marriage of 30 years to Flavia Rodrigues Alves he has a daughter, Luisa Mariano (1986), a singer, vocal producer, music business professional and graduate from Berklee College of Music, who worked at Sony Music, Buddah Brown Entertainment, and currently works freelance as Tour Manager and Vocal Producer.

Discography
Quarteto Sabá (1964) RGE
Sambalanço Trio (1964) RGE
Sambalanço Trio II (1965) RGE
Lennie Dale e o Sambalanço Trio (1965) Elenco
Raulzinho e o Sambalanço Trio (1965) RCA
Reencontro com Sambalanço Trio (1965) RGE
Octeto de César Camargo Mariano (1966) RGE
Som Três (1966) RGE
Som Três Show (1968)
Som Três Vol. II (1969) RGE
Som Três Vol. III - Um é Pouco, Dois é Bom (1970)
Som Três Vol. IV - Tobogã (1971) Odeon Brazil
São Paulo - Brasil (1978) RCA Brazil
César Camargo Mariano & Cia. (1980)
Samambaia (1981) EMI/Odeon Brazil
A Todas As Amizades (1983) Columbia Brazil
Todas As Teclas (1984) Ariola - with Wagner Tiso
Voz & Suor (1984) EMI/Odeon
Prisma (1985) Pointer Brazil - with Nelson Ayres
Mitos (1988)  Sony Brazil
Ponte das Estrelas (1988) Sony Brazil
César Camargo Mariano (1989) Chorus Brazil
Natural (1993) Polygram
Nós (1994) Velas - with Leny Andrade
Solo Brasileiro (1994)  Polygram Brazil
Piano Voz y Sentimiento (1997) Polygram Mexico
Duo: Romero Lubambo e César Camargo Mariano (2002)  Trama Brazil
Nova Saudade (2002) Rob Digital Brazil
Piano & Voz: César Camargo Mariano e Pedro Mariano (2003) Trama Brazil
Ao Vivo with Leny Andrade (2007)

Awards

CLIO awards
International radio
Winner: Music/lyrics
Chevrolet Line - "The World Out There"
Music Director
Music Composer

International radio
Winner: Overall campaign
Chevrolet Line - "The World Out There"
Music Director
Music Composer

International TV/cinema
Recognition: Music
GM Cars - "See The Country"
Music composerInternational radioRecognition: Beverages
Coca-Cola - "There Are Times...."
Music composerInternational radioRecognition: Music/lyrics
Chevrolet Line - "Come On"
Music composerInternational radioRecognition: Beverages
Coca-Cola - "It Doesn't Matter..."
PersonalitiesInternational radioRecognition: Overall campaign
Coca-Cola - "There Are Times...", "It Doesn't Matter"
Music composerInternational radioRecognition; Automotive
Chevrolet Line - "Come On"
Music composerInternational radioRecognition; Music scoring
Hilton cigarettes - "Hilton"
Music arrangementInternational radioRecognition: Automotive
Chevrolet Line - "It's For Real Samba"
Composer
Music DirectorInternational radio'Recognition: Automotive
Chevrolet Line - "It's For Real Funk"
Composer

Latin Grammy awards
 2004 Best MPB Album: Piano & Voz (nominated)
 2006 Latin Grammy Lifetime Achievement Award
 2007 Best MPB Album: Ao Vivo (with Leny Andrade)
 2017 Best Instrumental Album: Joined'' (with Rudiger) (nominated)

Sharp Music award
Second Sharp Music Award
Best Arranger "Samba"
Fifth Sharp Music award
Best Arranger: "Instrumental"
Seventh Sharp Music Award
Best Arranger: "Instrumental"

Playboy award
V Playboy award
Best Arranger

TIM Music Award
First Brazilian TIM Music Award
Best Instrumental Album: "Duo"

APCA Awards
1972 Best Arranger
1974 Best Arranger
1976 Special Highlight
1978 Best Arranger
1979 Best Arranger
1980 Best Pianist
1979 Best Arranger
1982 Best Arranger and Best Pianist
1983 Best Arranger and Best Pianist
1984 Best Arranger and Best Pianist

References

External links
 – official site

César Camargo Mariano on Myspace
César Camargo Mariano interview on Artists Interviews

1943 births
Living people
Música Popular Brasileira pianists
Brazilian jazz pianists
Latin Grammy Award winners
Businesspeople from São Paulo
Brazilian music arrangers
Brazilian record producers
Latin Grammy Lifetime Achievement Award winners
Latin music record producers
Latin music composers
21st-century pianists
Sambalanço Trio members
Sunnyside Records artists
PolyGram artists